Memeza is an album recorded by Brenda Fassie and Sello Chicco Twala in 1997. The album was released on 3 November 1997, the same day as Brenda's birthday. It was the best selling album in South Africa in 1997. The album went Platinum on the day of its release & sold over 100 000 in a week of its release. The album went to sell 1 million units in 6 months.

Background
Memeza was released in 1997 by CCP Records in its physical form. EMI Digital re-released the album in its digital form in 2004. The music is characterised as largely pop/rock and Kwaito (a South African urban music style). Its themes range from tradition to marriage. Sello Twala and Brenda Fassie co-wrote all the songs for the album and Twala handled the production thereof.

Track listing

 "Qula"
 "Sum' Bulala"
 "Vuli Ndlela"
 "Msindo"
 "Memeza"
 "Vuli Ndlela (Remix)"
 "Qula (Remix)"
 "Sum' Bulala (Remix)"

References

Brenda Fassie albums
1997 albums